Alexandre Bias (born 21 April 1981) is a French rugby union player. His position is Flanker and he currently plays for Castres Olympique in the Top 14.

References

1981 births
Living people
French rugby union players
Sportspeople from Saint-Denis, Seine-Saint-Denis
Castres Olympique players
Montpellier Hérault Rugby players
Rugby union flankers